Emmanuel (stylized in all caps) is the second extended play (EP) by American rapper Ameer Vann. It was released on September 18, 2019, by Winston Wolf, LLC and The Orchard. The EP is his first solo release since his departure from Brockhampton following sexual misconduct allegations in 2018.

Release and promotion
On September 16, 2019, Vann posted on Instagram himself and a billboard with the album cover, the text reading "AMEER VANN AVAILABLE NOW EMMANUEL". The EP was released at midnight for each time zone respectively, with New Zealand being the first. On September 18, 2019, Vann released the music video for the title track, "Emmanuel". More music videos were released for the tracks "Los Angeles" and "Glock 19" on October 1, 2019 and December 17, 2019, respectively.

Critical reception 
The album received positive reviews from NME and HotNewHipHop, while Popdust gave a negative review calling the album "self-loathing" and labeling Vann as an unrepentant misogynist.

Track listing

Samples
"Pop Trunk" contains vocal samples by Pimp C from "International Player’s Anthem (I Choose You)" by UGK.

References

2019 EPs
Albums produced by Hit-Boy
Albums produced by Cubeatz
Albums produced by Cool & Dre